Alonso (or Alfonso) Ortiz (Alfonso Hortiz de Urrutia), (Villarrobledo, Albacete, 1455- † h. 1503) was a Spanish humanist writer.

Renaissance writers
Spanish male writers
1455 births
1503 deaths
University of Salamanca alumni